The 1992 World Snooker Championship (also referred to as the 1992 Embassy World Snooker Championship for the purposes of sponsorship) was a professional ranking snooker tournament that took place between 18 April and 4 May 1992 at the Crucible Theatre in Sheffield, England.

John Parrott was the defending champion but he lost 12–13 to Alan McManus in the quarter-finals and fell to the Crucible curse, becoming another champion unable to defend his first world title.

Stephen Hendry was the eventual winner, after defeating Jimmy White 18–14 in the final. At one point White led by 14–8, but Hendry then won 10 successive frames to secure his second World Championship title. The tournament was sponsored by cigarette manufacturer Embassy.

Tournament summary
 Debutants at the Crucible this year were Peter Ebdon, Mark Johnston-Allen, Mick Price, Chris Small, Stephen Murphy, Nigel Bond and James Wattana. Ebdon, Price, Small and Wattana reached the second round.
 Steve Davis' 4–10 defeat to qualifier Ebdon was his first loss in the opening round since 1982. It also ended his nine-year streak of reaching at least the semi-finals of the tournament.
 Jimmy White became only the second player ever to compile a maximum break at the Crucible, during his 10–4 first round win over Tony Drago, nine years after Cliff Thorburn's maximum in 1983. The highest break of the qualifying stage was 141 made by Joe Johnson.
 The 10–0 win by defending champion John Parrott over Eddie Charlton in the first round was the first-ever  in Crucible history. There would not be another whitewash until Shaun Murphy's 10–0 defeat of Luo Honghao in 2019.
 Eight of the sixteen seeded players exited the tournament in the first round. This did not happen again until 2012.
 Stephen Hendry secured a record in the semi-final, when he beat Terry Griffiths 16–4. This was the biggest semi-final victory at the World Championship, until it was superseded by Ronnie O'Sullivan in 2004 when he defeated Hendry 17–4.
The final was notable for Hendry producing a massive comeback to overturn a sizeable deficit against White: Hendry trailed 8–14 during the third session, before winning ten consecutive frames to take his second world title with an 18–14 victory. This match was showcased on BBC Two on 24 April 2020, one of the "Crucible Classics" shown in place of the 2020 World Snooker Championship which was postponed because of the coronavirus pandemic.

Prize fund
The breakdown of prize money for this year is shown below:

Winner: £150,000
Runner-up: £90,000
Semi-final: £45,000
Quarter-final: £22,500
Last 16: £12,000
Last 32: £6,500
Last 48: £5,000
Last 64: £3,000
Last 96: £1,375

Last 128: £750
Last 155: £500
Qualifying stage highest break: £4,000
Televised stage highest break: £14,000
Televised stage maximum break: £100,000
Total: £850,000

Main draw 
Shown below are the results for each round. The numbers in parentheses beside some of the players are their seeding ranks (each championship has 16 seeds and 16 qualifiers).

Century breaks 
There were 25 century breaks in the championship.

 147, 135, 134, 104, 101, 100  Jimmy White
 134, 130, 128, 112, 105, 103  Stephen Hendry
 134, 108, 108  Peter Ebdon
 132, 117  Neal Foulds
 132  Mick Price
 129  Nigel Bond

 114, 107  Dene O'Kane
 114  Dean Reynolds
 110  Chris Small
 108  Tony Knowles
 106  Willie Thorne

References

World Snooker Championships
World Championship
World Snooker Championship
Sports competitions in Sheffield
World Snooker Championship
World Snooker Championship